James Dinsdale (November 18, 1848 – December 28, 1928) was a member of the Wisconsin State Assembly.

Political career
Dinsdale was born in Askrigg, Richmondshire District, North Yorkshire, United Kingdom and died in Madison (town), Wisconsin at the age of 80. He was buried in Forest Hill Cemetery Soldiers Grove, Crawford County, Wisconsin. He was elected to the Assembly in 1902. Previously, he had been chairman of the Board of Crawford County, Wisconsin, and president of Soldiers Grove. He was a Republican.

References

External links

The Political Graveyard

English emigrants to the United States
Lawrence University alumni
Republican Party members of the Wisconsin State Assembly
People from Soldiers Grove, Wisconsin
People from Grant County, Wisconsin
People from Askrigg
Physicians from Wisconsin
1848 births
1928 deaths
Burials in Wisconsin